Antoine Karam (born 1956) is a Maronite Lebanese politician who served as the minister of environment.

Early life and education
Karam was born in Hadath in 1956. He holds a medicine degree, which he received from the University of St. Joseph in 1985.

Career
Karam is a member of the Lebanese Forces, led by Samir Geagea, since its inception. He is a member of party's executive committee.

He was appointed minister of environment to the cabinet led by Prime Minister Fouad Siniora on 11 July 2008. He was part of the 14 March alliance in the cabinet. His tenure ended in November 2009, and he was replaced by Mohammad Naji Rahhal in the post.

Personal life
Karam is married to Danielle Mattar and has two children.

References

20th-century Lebanese physicians
1956 births
Government ministers of Lebanon
Lebanese Forces politicians
Lebanese Maronites
Living people
Saint Joseph University alumni